S. nigra is an abbreviation of a species name. In binomial nomenclature the name of a species is always the name of the genus to which the species belongs, followed by the species name (also called the species epithet). In S. nigra the genus name has been abbreviated to S. and the species has been spelled out in full. In a document that uses this abbreviation it should always be clear from the context which genus name has been abbreviated.

The Latin species epithet nigra means "black". Some of the most common uses of S. nigra are:
 Salix nigra, a species of willow
 Sambucus nigra, a species of elder (elderberry)

There are many other possibilities, for example, the following genus names that start with S have a species name with the epithet nigra.

Vascular plants:
 Sapota nigra
 Schisandra nigra
 Schnella nigra
 Serapias nigra
 Setachna nigra
 Sieberia nigra
 Sinapis nigra
 Siparuna nigra
 Smilax nigra
 Stenogyne nigra
 Struthiopteris nigra
 Suaeda nigra

Beetles:
 Saperda nigra
 Stenomordellaria nigra
 Stenurella nigra

Other organisms:
 Sarinda nigra, a spider
 Scoparia nigra, a butterfly
 Scutellospora, a fungus
 Siphamia nigra, a fish
 Stegana nigra, a fly
 Strumigenys nigra, an ant

See also 
 Solanum nigrum
 Sorghum nigrum
 S. niger (disambiguation)
 Nigra (disambiguation)